Netcraft is an Internet services company based in Bath, Somerset, England. The company provides cybercrime disruption services across a range of industries.

History
Netcraft was founded by Mike Prettejohn. The company provides web server and web hosting market-share analysis, including web server and operating system detection. In some cases, depending on the queried server's operating system, their service is able to monitor uptimes; uptime performance monitoring is a commonly used factor in determining the reliability of a web hosting provider. Netcraft has explored the internet since 1995 and is a respected authority on the market share of web servers, operating systems, hosting providers, ISPs, encrypted transactions, electronic commerce, scripting languages and content technologies on the internet.

As a PCI-DSS approved scanning vendor, Netcraft also provides security testing, and publishes news releases about the state of various networks that make up the Internet.

The company is also known for its free anti-phishing toolbar for the Firefox, Internet Explorer, and Chrome browsers. Starting with version 9.5, the built-in anti-phishing filter in the Opera browser uses the same data as Netcraft's toolbar, eliminating the need for a separately installed toolbar. A study commissioned by Microsoft concluded that Netcraft's toolbar was among the most effective tools to combat phishing on the Internet, although this has since been superseded by Microsoft's own Internet Explorer 7 with Microsoft Phishing Filter, possibly as a result of licensing Netcraft's data. The service can only process public IPv4 servers at the exclusion of IPv6. The browser extensions will display security information for a domain's IPv4 servers even when the user is connected to a different server over IPv6.

In November 2016, Philip Hammond, Chancellor of the Exchequer, announced plans for the UK government to work with Netcraft to develop better automatic defences to reduce the impact of cyber-attacks affecting the UK.

Industry competitors include: Alexa Internet, Compete.com, comScore, Customer knowledge, Hitwise, Nielsen ratings, Quantcast, SimilarWeb, and Spyfu.

See also 
 Search engine optimization metrics
 DShield, Cybercrime analytics
 WOT Services, community of volunteer users ranking website reputation

References

External links 
 

Information technology companies of England
Privately held companies of England
Companies based in Bath, Somerset
Software companies established in 1994
1994 establishments in England
British companies established in 1994
Computer security companies
Web analytics